North Slavic may refer to:

 North Slavic languages
 North Slavs

Language and nationality disambiguation pages